Martin Knosp (born 7 October 1959 in Renchen) is a German former wrestler who competed in the 1984 Summer Olympics.

References

External links
 

1959 births
Living people
Olympic wrestlers of West Germany
Wrestlers at the 1984 Summer Olympics
German male sport wrestlers
Olympic silver medalists for West Germany
Olympic medalists in wrestling
Medalists at the 1984 Summer Olympics